Juan Manuel Benitez Fernel (born 1974 in Badajoz, Spain) is an Emmy award-winning journalist working in the United States. He is a bilingual anchor/reporter at Spectrum News NY1, covering politics, climate change and Hispanic issues. Since 2005, he is the host of Pura Política, a weekly current-affairs program on NY1 Noticias.  

Benitez is an adjunct professor at Craig Newmark Graduate School of Journalism. He's also taught journalism at Columbia University. 

Over the years, he's been a regular guest host of The Brian Lehrer Show on WNYC Radio. 

In 2007, Benitez was a guest host for Viva Voz, a talk-show on V-me.

He lives with his husband, Tazjuan Starr, in New York City.

References

External links
  juanmanuelbenitez.com

1974 births
Living people
People from Badajoz
American television journalists
Spanish television journalists
American male journalists